Matthew 6:7 is the seventh verse of the sixth chapter of the Gospel of Matthew in the New Testament and is part of the Sermon on the Mount. This verse continues the discussion on the proper procedure for praying.

Content

In the King James Version of the Bible the text reads:

The World English Bible translates the passage as:

The Novum Testamentum Graece text is:

Analysis
The term translated as "vain repetitions" is battalogein. This word is unknown outside this verse, appearing in no other literature contemporaneous with the text. It may be linked to the Greek term for "babbling", or be derived from the Hebrew , meaning "vain". It is often assumed to be a related to the word polugein, and thus a reference to a large quantity of words.

This verse moves away from condemning the hypocrites to condemning the Gentiles. The text does not specify who exactly the "Gentiles" mentioned are, though pagan prayers to Baal and other gods are mentioned in the Old Testament. In , the version of this verse found in the Book of Luke, it is not the Gentiles who are condemned but "the rest of men."

France notes that in this era, Gentile prayer was portrayed as repeated incantations that had to be perfectly recited, but where the spirit and understanding of the prayer were secondary. Fowler states that the Jews believed the pagans needed to incessantly repeat their prayers, as their gods would not answer them, whereas followers of the Abrahamic God did not need to repeat their prayers, as their God would hear them the first time.

Schweizer presents an alternate view. He does not feel battalogein is a reference to repetition, but to nonsense. He argues that the Jews of that era felt that the pagans had forgotten the true name of God, and that their prayers were thus filled with long lists of meaningless words in an attempt to ensure the true name of God would at some point be mentioned.

Matthew 6:7 is not generally seen as a condemnation of repetitive prayer. Jesus himself gives a prayer to be repeated in Matthew 6:9, and Matthew 26:44 is noted to be repeating a prayer himself. This verse is read as a condemnation of rote prayer without understanding of why one is praying. Protestants such as Martin Luther have used this verse to attack Catholic prayer practices such as the use of rosaries.

Commentary from the Church Fathers
Augustine:

John Cassian:

Chrysostom:

Glossa Ordinaria:

Gregory the Great:

Notes

References

06:07
Christian prayer